Romery may refer to the following places in France:

 Romery, Aisne, a commune in the department of Aisne
 Romery, Marne, a commune in the department of Marne